is a Japanese adult visual novel developed by Palette, and it was released in Japan on October 30, 2009 for Microsoft Windows PCs. Mashiroiro Symphony is Palette's ninth title. The gameplay in Mashiroiro Symphony follows a linear plot line, which offers pre-determined scenarios and differs upon the player's decisions, and its storyline focuses on the appeal of the four female main characters. Futago Minazuki has illustrated three manga adaptations serialized in Kadokawa Shoten's Comp Ace magazine. Four drama CD adaptations titled Mashiroiro Symphony Original Drama CD Series were released by Lantis in 2010. A 12-episode anime adaptation produced by Manglobe aired in Japan between October and December 2011.

Gameplay

The gameplay in Mashiroiro Symphony requires little interaction from the player, as most of the duration of the game is only spent on reading the text that appears on the lower portion of the screen, representing either dialogue between characters, or the inner thoughts of the protagonist. Every so often, the player will come to a "decision point", where they are given the chance to choose from multiple options. The time between these points varies and can occur anywhere from a minute to much longer. Text progression pauses at these points and depending on the choices that the player makes, the plot will progress in a specific direction. There are four main plot lines in the original release that the player will have the chance to experience, one for each of the heroines in the story. This is increased to six plot lines in the PlayStation Portable version with the extended scenario for two female characters. To view all of the plot lines, the player will have to replay the game multiple times and make different decisions to progress the plot in an alternate direction.

Plot
As part of the merger, students from both schools are selected to participate in a test class at the Yuihime Girls' Academy campus, an act which is initially opposed by the female student body.

Characters

Main characters

 (Drama CD/anime)
Shingo is the main protagonist and is a second-year student of Kagamidai Academy. He is very hardworking and kind. He was selected as a test student, and transferred to Yuihime Girls' Academy to participate in 2-T, the second-year test class. He was elected the class representative. He quickly makes friends with several girls at Yuihime Girls' Academy, though Airi does not want to get along with him or any of the other boys. He was sickly and asthmatic in his childhood, but he is in good health now. His parents are busy with their work and are seldom at home.

 (PC), Ryōko Ono (Drama CD/PSP/anime)
Airi is a second-year student of Yuihime Girls' Academy and the principal's daughter. She always gets the best grades among all second-year students. At first, she was against the plan for merging of the schools, and rejected male students from Kagamidai Academy, but she began getting along with them several weeks later. She was elected the class representative along with Shingo. She was born and brought up in an upper class family in the Old District, but she has lived by herself in a low-priced apartment in the New District since she started attending Yuihime Girls' Academy. She lives in a simple life and often goes shopping to a local supermarket in the New District named Kume Mart to buy reasonable-priced food and daily necessities.

 (PC), Mai Gotō (Drama CD/PSP/anime)
Sakuno is Shingo's younger stepsister and first-year student of Kagamidai Academy; her father married Shingo's mother about ten years ago. She has a quiet personality and is good at cooking, but has a poor sense of direction and often gets lost. She was selected as a test student with her brother, and transferred to Yuihime Girls' Academy to participate in 1-T, the first-year test class. She happened to meet Airi at night on September 30, the day before the transferring on October 1. She became close friends with Airi at that time. She often goes shopping to Kume Mart, too. She is youngest but tallest among the main female characters.

 (PC), Oma Ichimura (Drama CD/PSP/anime)
Angelina, nicknamed , is a second-year student of Yuihime Girls' Academy. Unlike other female students, she does not wear school uniform, but always wears a maid costume. She is in Shingo's class and tries to help the students from Kagamidai Academy assimilate. Her father is Japanese and her mother is British, but she speaks only Japanese because she was born and brought up in Japan. She has a cheerful personality and is very good at housekeeping tasks such as cooking and cleaning, but is weak at general educational subjects such as English and mathematics. Her favorite food is tokoroten.

 (PC), Noriko Rikimaru (Drama CD/PSP/anime)
Miu is a third-year student of Yuihime Girls' Academy. She lives in a house nearby the school with her mother and two cats. She works part-time at a maid café named Dolce to earn money for club activities; as the Nuko Club is not an official club, the club's budget is not supplied by the school. She is very kind to Shingo and becomes fond of him. She is eldest but shortest among the main characters.

 (PC), Mayumi Yoshida (Drama CD/PSP/anime)
Sana is a second-year student of Yuihime Girls' Academy and Airi's childhood friend. Although a supporting character in the PC game version, she is a main character in the PSP game version, as the result of taking first place in a favorite character poll of the game. She likes Miu very much and is in the Nuko Club because of her. Although she does not like boys, she makes an effort to makes the male students from Kagamidai Academy feel welcome, but she later reverts to her true self. She dislikes Shingo especially and often calls him . This is exacerbated when she notes the growing closeness between Shingo and Miu. In the anime, Sana develops feelings for Shingo herself, but is heartbroken when Shingo and Miu start dating since she realizes that if she had been nicer to him, he might have chosen her.

 (PSP/anime)
Yutsuki is a new female character included in the PSP game version. She is a second-year student of Yuihime Girls' Academy, but is not in Shingo's class. She is in the drama club. She is good at cooking but not good at cleaning. She lives in a shrine with her parents and grandmother. In the anime, she appears in the last episode.

Others
 
  (PC), Tatsuhisa Suzuki (Drama CD/PSP/anime)
 Hayata is a second-year male student of Kagamidai Academy and Shingo's good friend. He is Kagamidai Academy's student council president. He also transferred to Yuihime Girls' Academy to participate in 2-T. He acts as the vice-president at Yuihime Girls' Academy's student council. He has a fiancée.

 
  (PC), Harumi Sakurai (Drama CD/PSP/anime)
 Ranka is Airi's mother and the principal of Yuihime Girls' Academy. She is very popular among her students. She got a divorce from her husband more than ten years ago.

 
  (PC), Kei Mizusawa (Drama CD/PSP/anime)
 Machi is a female teacher who teaches Japanese at Yuihime Girls' Academy. She is the homeroom teacher of Shingo's class, 2-T; Airi, Angelina, Sana and Hayata are also in the same class. She is shy and is not good at talking with young men, but she actually likes boys' love. She is a 29-year-old single woman and wants to get married as soon as possible. She becomes the adviser for the Nuko Club (in Miu's storyline of the game and the seventh episode of the anime).

 
  (PC), Michiru Yuimoto (Drama CD/PSP/anime)
 Yuiko is Miu's mother. She often gets mistaken for Miu's older sister due to her young appearance. She is a graduate of Yuihime Girls' Academy, and Ranka's friend. She has two cats named Domon and Karin inside the house. Her husband lives in a distant town on business.

 
  (Drama CD)
 Eleanor is Angelina's mother from Britain, who lives in Britain with her husband. She is a graduate of Yuihime Girls' Academy, too. She appears in the third drama CD volume.

 
  (PSP)
 Setsu is Yutsuki's grandmother. She is a new character included in the PSP game version.

 
  (PSP)
 Rio is Sana's younger brother, who is too young to attend school. He is a new character included in the PSP game version. He is the reason why Sana dislikes boys (Rio also hates girls because of his sister).

 
  (PC), Harumi Sakurai (Drama CD/PSP/anime)
 Pannya is a strange, female cat-like creature that lives on the campus of Yuihime Girls' Academy. She is close to Miu. Her name "Pannya" comes from "panda" and "nyanko" ("kitty" in Japanese).

Development

Mashiroiro Symphony is the ninth title developed by the visual novel developer Palette, after their previous titles such as Moshimo Ashita ga Hare Naraba and Sakura Strasse. Mashiroiro Symphony scenario was written by three people: Hozumi K, who wrote Airi and Angelina's storylines; Hare Kitagawa, who has previously worked on Minori's Haru no Ashioto, provided Sakuno's storyline; and Orgel, who provided Miu and Sana's storyline. Character design and art direction for the game was split among three people: Tsubasu Izumi, who worked on Feng's Akaneiro ni Somaru Saka, provided character designs for female characters; Tamahiyo provided designs for two male characters, Shingo Uryū and Hayata Mukunashi; and Nagomi Tozakura provided super deformed illustrations. Mashiroiro Symphony music was solely composed by Burton, who provided music for Sakura Strasse. Tsubasu Izumi and Burton also work on Palette's thirteenth title Koi ga Saku Koro Sakura Doki, which was released on June 27, 2014.

Mashiroiro Symphony was first released for Microsoft Windows PCs on October 30, 2009. An all-ages edition developed by HuneX and published by Comfort playable on the PlayStation Portable (PSP), titled Mashiroiro Symphony: *mutsu no Hana, was released on June 30, 2011.

Adaptations

Manga
Mashiroiro Symphony received three manga adaptations illustrated by Japanese illustrator Futago Minazuki, which were serialized in the manga magazine Comp Ace. The first manga adaptation, which covers Airi Sena, was serialized between the November 2009 and October 2010 issues, published on September 26, 2009 and August 26, 2010, respectively. The twelve individual chapters were later collected into two tankōbon volumes published by Kadokawa Shoten on April 26, 2010 and September 25, 2010. A second manga adaptation illustrated by Minazuki titled , which covers Sana Inui, was serialized between the April and September 2011 issues of Comp Ace. Six chapters were collected into a single volume released on August 26, 2011. A third manga illustrated by Minazuki titled , which covers Yutsuki Onomiya, was serialized between the October 2011 and January 2012 issues of Comp Ace. Four chapters were collected into a single volume and will released on December 26, 2011. A manga anthology illustrated by various artists titled Magi-Cu 4-koma Mashiroiro Symphony was released by Enterbrain on March 25, 2010.

Drama CDs
Lantis released four drama CDs titled collectively as the Mashiroiro Symphony Original Drama CD Series, one for each heroine. Airi's CD, titled , was released on July 21, 2010. Sakuno's CD, titled , was released on August 25, 2010. Angelina's CD, titled , was released on September 22, 2010. Lastly, Miu's CD, titled , was released on October 27, 2010.

Internet radio show
An Internet radio show to promote the anime series titled  began airing on October 4, 2011. The show is produced by Lantis Web Radio and is streamed biweekly. It is hosted by Takahiro Mizushima and Ryōko Ono, the voices of Shingo and Airi in the anime, respectively.

Anime
A 12-episode anime television series adaptation produced by Manglobe and directed by Eiji Suganuma titled  aired between October 5 and December 21, 2011 on TV Aichi. The story is based on Miu's route of the game, but also includes parts of other routes as well. The screenplay was written by Team Rikka, and the chief animation director Toshie Kawamura based the character design used in the anime on Tsubasu Izumi's and Tamahiyo's original concepts. The music was produced by Nijine, and the sound director is Satoshi Yano. The series was released on six Blu-ray Disc (BD) and DVD compilation volumes between January 25 and June 27, 2012. This series was streamed online with English-subtitles by Crunchyroll and the Anime Network. Sentai Filmworks has licensed the series in North America and released the series with on DVD with English subtitles on December 4, 2012.

Music
The visual novel Mashiroiro Symphony has three theme songs: the opening theme  sung by Miyuki Hashimoto, the insert song  sung by Aki Misato, and the ending theme  sung by ЯIRE. The PC game's original soundtrack was released by Palette on December 27, 2009. An image song album titled Mashiroiro Symphony Original Drama Series Sound Portrait was released on November 24, 2010 by Lantis featuring the theme songs from the drama CDs as well as other songs by Hashimoto, Misato, Rino and ЯIRE.

The anime has two theme songs: the opening theme "Authentic Symphony" by Choucho, and the ending theme  by Marble. "Sayonara Kimi no Koe" is also included in the anime's final episode. The single for "Authentic Symphony" was released on October 26, 2011, while the single for "Suisai Candy" was released on November 9, 2011. Two character song singles sung by the voice actresses from the anime were released by Lantis. The first, titled "Character Palette Vol. 1", for the characters Airi Sena and Sakuno Uryū, sung by Ryōko Ono and Mai Gotō, respectively, was released on November 23, 2011. The second, titled "Character Palette Vol. 2", for the characters Miu Amaha, Sana Inui and Angelina Nanatsu Sewell, sung by Noriko Rikimaru, Mayumi Yoshida and Oma Ichimura, respectively, was released on December 21, 2011. The anime's original soundtrack titled  was released on January 25, 2012.

Reception
From July to September 2009, Mashiroiro Symphony ranked three times in the top ten in national PC game pre-orders in Japan. The rankings were at No. 10 in July, No. 7 in August, and No. 1 in September. Mashiroiro Symphony ranked twice in terms of national sales of PC games in Japan: at No. 1 in October 2009 and at No. 49 in January 2010.

Notes

References

External links
Palette's official Mashiroiro Symphony website 
Comfort's official Mashiroiro Symphony: *mutsu-no-hana website 
Anime official website 

2009 manga
2009 video games
2011 Japanese television series debuts
2011 manga
Bishōjo games
Eroge
Harem anime and manga
Harem video games
Japan-exclusive video games
Kadokawa Shoten manga
Lantis (company)
Manga based on video games
Manglobe
PlayStation Portable games
Romance anime and manga
Romance video games
School life in anime and manga
School-themed video games
Seinen manga
Sentai Filmworks
Video games developed in Japan
Visual novels
Windows games
HuneX games